The following is the discography of Pilotpriest, including albums and singles. Pilotpriest is Anthony Scott Burns' DJ name. He has released a number of albums and EPs, as well as multiple singles and remixes. The 2010 single "4th of July (Fireworks)" by Kelis samples "You're My Heart (Pilotpriest Remix)" by Lioness, which was released in 2009.

Discography

Albums

EPs

Singles

Remixes

References

External links
Pilotpriest at Vimeo
Pilotpriest at Bandcamp
Pilotpriest at YouTube

Discographies of Canadian artists